Engkanto (from Spanish encanto) are mythical environmental spirits that are said to have the ability to appear in human form.  They are often associated with the spirits of ancestors in the Philippines. They are also characterized as spirit sorts like sirens, dark beings, elves, and more. Belief in their existence has likely existed for centuries, and continues to this day.

It is a bracket term for enchanted human-like beings of the land which includes a variety of mythical races. The term itself was adopted from the Spanish, who were dumbfounded by the wide array of mythical races in the Philippines and just referred to many of the races as "enchanted". Though at the same time the term does not differ at all from the archaic Spanish sense of the word as referring to a supernatural apparition, sometimes tied to a place.

Appearance
Engkanto have many similarities to humans in that they age, appear to have male and female sexes, can suffer from illness and indeed even die. They are an object of mythology for many Filipinos, often told by adults as stories and shown on media. They have different appearances. Some appear to be beautiful having blue eyes, fair complexion and golden hair.  They may however have unusual features such as high-bridged noses and lack of philtrum. They have a wide range of appearances but one common fact of a different feeling or vibe than humans. Other variants exhibit sexual dimorphism such as Bagobo spirits which are separated into the female tahamaling and the male mahomanay. The female spirit is alleged to have red complexion while the male have a fair complexion. Their dwellings will normally appear as natural features, for example large rocks or trees, or shadows in human form; although to humans they have befriended they can appear as magnificent palaces. These creatures prefer large trees and nature such as the balete in which they also place their belongings. An engkanto may choose to stay by a human's side as told by stories where characters are usually in either a sense of trance or a deep loss of energy. Engkanto may be good or bad.

Capabilities

Engkanto are most commonly known for either extreme malignant effects, or an overwhelming influence of luck. Those the Engkanto do not favor had become depressed, suffered from madness, or even disappeared for days or months, possibly as a result of the human possession.  They are also said to be capable of causing fevers and skin diseases such as boils. These spirits also sometimes lead travelers astray in the forest, even kidnap them. This, however, is said to be avoidable by bringing an "Anting-anting" or "Agimat" a piece of magical charm or amulet that wards away evil spirits and prevents them from harming the wielder. However, if they do favor someone they are generous and capable of bringing power and riches to that person.  Shaman often try to commune with Engkanto on holy days to obtain better healing powers from them, as well as learning how to better deal with evil spirits.

Study
Francisco Demetrio made a study of 87 folk stories from Visayas and Mindanao relating to Engkanto. He contended the Engkanto were based on early European friars.

See also
Philippine mythology
Fair folk
Biringan city

References

Philippine legendary creatures
Nature spirits